Repče is a small village in the hills south of Trebnje in Lower Carniola in eastern Slovenia. The Municipality of Trebnje is part of the Southeast Slovenia Statistical Region.

References

External links
Repče at Geopedia

Populated places in the Municipality of Trebnje